The 2002 Delray Beach International Tennis Championships was a men's tennis tournament played on outdoor hard courts at the Delray Beach Tennis Center in Delray Beach, Florida in the United States and was part of the International Series of the 2002 ATP Tour. It was the 10th edition of the tournament and ran from March 4 through March 11, 2002. Fifth-seeded Davide Sanguinetti won the singles title.

Finals

Singles

 Davide Sanguinetti defeated  Andy Roddick 6–4, 4–6, 6–4
 It was Sanguinetti's 2nd singles title of the year and of his career.

Doubles

 Martin Damm /  Cyril Suk defeated  David Adams /  Ben Ellwood 6–4, 6–7(5–7), [10–5]
 It was Damm's 1st title of the year and the 21st of his career. It was Suk's 1st title of the year and the 23rd of his career.

References

External links
 Official website
 ATP tournament profile
 ITF tournament edition details

Delray Beach International Tennis Championships
Delray Beach Open
 
Delray Beach International Tennis Championships
Delray Beach International Tennis Championships
Delray Beach International Tennis Championships